Dr. Donald A. Fishman (Ph.D., 1978) is a communication scholar specializing in communication law, crisis communication, public relations, media criticism, broadcast regulations, and public speaking at Boston College.

Education
Fishman completed his undergraduate coursework at the University of Minnesota, and he received both of his graduate degrees from Northwestern University where he was briefly employed.

Career
Fishman currently serves as associate professor and assistant chair of the department of communication at Boston College. He also holds the position of first vice president-elect of the Eastern Communication Association. In addition, he is the chair of the Eastern Communication Association's Task Force on the Status of Interest Groups, and the vice-chair and primary planner for the Commission on Parliamentary Procedure's associated with the National Communication Association (Boston College).

He has received awards for his contributions to the field, including the 1998 Haiman Award for Distinguished Scholarship in Freedom of Expression from the National Communication Association, the 2001 Phifer Award for Outstanding Scholarship in Parliamentary Procedure from the Commission on American Parliamentary Practice, the 2001 O'Neill Award for Outstanding Paper in Freedom of Expression at the National Communication Association Convention, and the 2003 O'Neill Award for Outstanding Paper in Freedom of Expression at the National Communication Association Convention.

Contributions and works 
Fishman's most cited piece of literature is titled “ValuJet Flight 592: Crisis communication theory blended and extended.” In this work, Fishman uses the communication surrounding the crash of ValuJet Flight 592 as the scenario for which he applies a type of blended methodology approach to crisis communication. The blend he devised uses components from three previously existing crisis communication theories: Steven Fink's Natural History Approach, William Benoit's Image Restoration Approach, and Thomas Birkland's Focusing Events Approach.

The paper begins by discussing the event the blended method is being applied to (the disaster itself). An introduction to some of the communication surrounding the event is presented,  including public addresses from  Senior Federal Aviation Administration (FAA) officer David Hinsonand, and a  damage control speech given by the United States Secretary of Transportation Federico Pena, who is quoted in the paper saying, "I've flown ValuJet. ValuJet is a safe airline, as is our entire aviation system. Whenever we have found any issues, ValuJet has been responsive, they have been cooperative, they have in some cases even exceeded the safety standards that we have."

The paper then defines crisis communication largely in terms of what is and is not a legitimate crisis situation, and how the word is improperly used in many context today. It is continued by briefly explaining each of the three approaches that are used to create the blended methodology. In the paper Fishman states, “The models used in conjunction strengthen rather than undermine the claims that each approach offers, and that each model provides insights that reinforce constructs that the other model ignores or undervalues.” He applies his blend to the ValuJet crisis by demonstrating what pieces of each model most appropriately fit each step in the crisis communication process. For example, he applies the Prodromal Stage of Fink's model to the initial occurrence of the ValuJet crash, because Benoit's model would require an accusation, and is more appropriate than Birkland's “focusing event” concept. This application theme continues throughout the paper, thus making Fishman's large contribution blended methodology.

Fishman does, however, state in the paper that the blended theory method may not be applicable in all crisis communication situations. However, he finds many scenarios in which he his blended methodology was applicable. Among these are the United States Navy’s 1991 Tailhook sexual misconduct scandal, Tylenol's 1982 cyanide mishap, Exxon's 1989 Valdez oil spill, and more.

References

Living people
Boston College people
University of Minnesota alumni
Northwestern University alumni
Year of birth missing (living people)